In Harm's Way is a 1988 video game published by Simulations Canada.

Gameplay
In Harm's Way is a game in which the player leads either the Japanese or American forces in a bid for control of the Pacific theater of World War II.

Reception
Lt. H. E. Dille reviewed the game for Computer Gaming World, and stated that "In Harm's Way is an excellent simulation of operational level decision-making that also remains faithful to the historical period covered. Those players who demand complete tactical control may be frustrated by this simulation, but for those who are willing to accept that chaos and confusion are a natural part of warfare, this is a "must" to add to a game library."

References

1988 video games
Simulations Canada video games